The Scout and Guide movement in Uruguay is served by
 Asociación Guías Scout del Uruguay, former member of the World Association of Girl Guides and Girl Scouts
 Movimiento Scout del Uruguay, member of the World Organization of the Scout Movement
 Scouts de Uruguay
 Asociación Uruguaya de Escultismo
 Conquistadores de la Iglesia Adventista, affiliated to Pathfinders
 Union de Scouts Tradicionales de America Uruguay, member of the Order of World Scouts

International Scouting units in Uruguay
In addition, there are American Boy Scouts in Montevideo, linked to the Direct Service branch of the Boy Scouts of America, which supports units around the world, as well as Girl Scouts of the USA.

See also